El Rosario is an at-grade station on the Mexico City Metro. It is located in Azcapotzalco borough, in the northern reaches of Mexico City. It serves as the terminal for both Lines 6 and 7.

General information
The station logo depicts a set of rosary beads.

The platforms for lines 6 and 7 are at the same level, separated only by a bridge. This terminal, like many others, is multimodal, connecting to other kinds of transport. Metro El Rosario connects with suburban buses that serve municipalities such as Cuautitlán Izcalli and Lechería, in neighboring Mexico State. It also connects with trolleybus Line "I", which runs between El Rosario and Metro Chapultepec.

This terminal was part of an intercity railway project, serving zones between El Rosario and Huehuetoca. Construction work on this railway line began in the 1990s, but it was never finished. Today some tracks and stations still remain.

Ridership

Nearby
Parque Tezozómoc, park.
Unidad Habitacional El Rosario, estate.

Exits

Line 6
East: Tierra Colorada street and Avenida El Rosario, El Rosario
West: Tierra Colorada street and Avenida El Rosario, El Rosario

Line 7
North: Tierra Caliente street and Avenida El Rosario, Colonia Tierra Nueva
South: Tierra caliente street and Tres Culturas avenue, Colonia Tierra Nueva

References

External links 

Mexico City Metro Line 6 stations
Railway stations opened in 1983
Railway stations opened in 1988
1983 establishments in Mexico
1988 establishments in Mexico
Mexico City Metro Line 7 stations
Mexico City Metro stations in Azcapotzalco
Accessible Mexico City Metro stations